Lincoln is an unincorporated village in Lincoln County, New Mexico, United States.

Description

The community sits in the Bonito Valley between the Sacramento Mountains and the Capitan Mountains at an elevation of 5,696 feet. The village is located approximately 57 miles (92 km) west of Roswell (by road) and just north of the Lincoln National Forest. Lincoln is the primary community in zip code 88338, which had a population of 189 residents in the 2010 census. The village is centered around a 1 mile stretch of U.S. Route 380 (also known as the Billy the Kid Trail), which is the village's only street. Numerous historic structures dating as far back as the late 1800s still remain, many of which have been preserved and now operate as public museums.

Originally called La Placita del Rio Bonito (The Place by the Pretty River) by the Mexican families who settled it in the 1850s, the name of the community was changed to Lincoln when Lincoln County was created on January 16, 1869. Lincoln was at the center of the Lincoln County War, 1876-1879, and is primarily known today for its historical ties to Billy the Kid. The village holds an annual festival called Old Lincoln Days in August featuring an open-air enactment of The Last Escape of Billy the Kid.

Lincoln has been Federally designated as the Lincoln Historic District, and also as a New Mexico State Monument called the Lincoln Historic Site. These designations, along with the efforts of generations of local residents, have made Lincoln one of the best preserved old west towns left in existence and the most visited monument in the State of New Mexico.

For about a year during World War II, the Old Raton Ranch, an abandoned Civilian Conservation Corps camp on the outskirts of Lincoln, was used to confine Japanese American railroad workers and their families. All 32 internees came from Clovis, New Mexico; the town's entire Japanese American population was placed under house arrest shortly after the attack on Pearl Harbor brought the U.S. into the war, and the Immigration and Naturalization Service "evacuated" them to Lincoln on January 23, 1942. Unlike the "assembly centers" where most Japanese Americans spent the first months of their wartime incarceration, access to school, employment and recreational activities was not permitted in Lincoln. On December 18, 1942, the internees were transferred to several of the more public concentration camps run by the War Relocation Authority.

Tourism and entertainment

Food and lodging 
The historic Wortley Hotel, once owned by Pat Garrett and central to the story of Billy the Kid, began serving guests in 1874 and still provides lodging to travelers. Lincoln also has a bar, the Bonito Valley Brewing Company, which serves a selection of locally brewed beer and non-alcoholic beverages. Annie's Little Sureshot Cafe serves coffee and snacks, and meals are served at the historic Dolan House.

Historic attractions 
Lincoln has numerous historic structures, nine of which are open to the public as museums operated by New Mexico Historic Sites. These include the Courthouse where Billy the Kid killed deputies James W. Bell and Bob Olinger, the Tunstall Store, the Convento, the Torreon and others. The Anderson Freeman Visitor's Center has interpretive displays and artifacts that depict the history of Lincoln and the Bonito Valley.

Nearby attractions 
 Fort Stanton Historic Site
 Smokey Bear Historical Park
 Snowy River Cave

See also 

 Lincoln County War

References

External links 

 New Mexico Historic Sites: Lincoln
 Friends of Historic Lincoln New Mexico

Unincorporated communities in New Mexico
Unincorporated communities in Lincoln County, New Mexico